Mivali Shirkhan (also Romanized as Mīvalī Shīrkhān; also known as Mīr‘alī-ye Dārāb and Mīvalī-ye ‘Olyā) is a village in Posht Tang Rural District, in the Central District of Sarpol-e Zahab County, Kermanshah Province, Iran. At the 2006 census, its population was 134, in 27 families.

References 

Populated places in Sarpol-e Zahab County